The eighteenth season of the American animated sitcom South Park premiered on Comedy Central on September 24, 2014 with "Go Fund Yourself", and ended with "#HappyHolograms" on December 10, 2014, with a total of ten episodes. The season featured serial elements and recurring story lines, which The A.V. Club noted as an experimentation with episode-to-episode continuity, in which the episodes "explore the consequences of the boys' actions [week to week], allowing the plots to be motivated in part by their attempts to dig themselves out of a hole". 
As with most seasons of the show, all episodes of season 18 were written and directed by the series co-creator and co-star Trey Parker.

Episodes

References

2014 American television seasons